Balai Chand Mukhopadhyay (19 July 1899 – 9 February 1979) was an Indian Bengali-language novelist, short story writer, playwright, poet, and physician who wrote under the pen name of Banaphul (meaning "the wild flower" in Bengali). He was a recipient of the civilian honour of the Padma Bhushan.

Life
Mukhopadhyay was born in Manihari village of Purnia district (now Katihar District), Bihar on 19 July 1899. His family originally hailed from Sehakhala situated in Hooghly District of present-day West Bengal. His father, Satyacharan Mukhopadhyay, was a doctor, and his mother was Mrinalini Devi. He originally took the pen name Banaphul ("the wild flower") to hide his literary activities from a disapproving teacher. He attended Hazaribag College and was later admitted in the Calcutta Medical College. He was assigned to Patna Medical College and Hospital after completing his medical degree, and later practised at Azimganj Hospital and worked as a pathologist at Bhagalpur. He moved to Lake Town, Calcutta, in 1968, and died there on 9 February 1979. He is the elder brother of famous Bengali film Director Arabinda Mukhopadhyay.

Literary works

He is most noted for his short vignettes, often just half-page long, but his body of work spanned sixty-five years and included "thousands of poems, 586 short stories (a handful of which have been translated to English), 60 novels, 5 dramas, a number of one-act plays, an autobiography called Paschatpat (Background), and numerous essays."

Novels

 Trinokhondo তৃণখণ্ড
 Boitorini Tire বৈতরণীর তীরে
 Niranjana নিরঞ্জনা
 Bhuban Som ভুবন সোম
 Maharani মহারাণী
 Agnishwar অগ্নীশ্বর
 Manaspur মানসপুর
 Erao achhe এরাও আছে
 Nabin Dutta নবীন দত্ত
 Harishchandra হরিশ্চন্দ্র
 Kichukshan কিছুক্ষণ
 Se O Ami সে ও আমি
 Saptarshi সপ্তর্ষি
 Udai Asta উদয় অস্ত
 Gandharaj গন্ধরাজ
 Pitambarer Punarjanma পীতাম্বরের পুনর্জন্ম
 Nayn Tatpurush নঞ তৎপুরুষ
 Krishnapaksha কৃষ্ণপক্ষ
 Sandhipuja সন্ধিপূজা
 Hate Bajare হাটেবাজারে
 Kanyasu কন্যাসু
 Adhiklal অধিকলাল
 Gopaldeber Swapna গোপালদেবের স্বপ্ন
 Swapna Sambhab স্বপ্নসম্ভব
 Kashti Pathar কষ্টিপাথর
 Prachchhanna Mahima প্রচ্ছন্ন মহিমা
 Dui Pathik দুই পথিক
 Ratri রাত্রি
 Pitamaha পিতামহ
 Pakshimithun পক্ষীমিথুন
 Tirther Kak তীর্থের কাক
 Rourab রৌরব
 Jaltaranga জলতরঙ্গ
 Rupkatha ebang Tarpar রূপকথা এবং তারপর
 Pratham Garal প্রথম গরল
 Rangaturanga রঙ্গতুরঙ্গ
 Ashabari আশাবারি
 Li ৯
 Sat Samudra Tero Nadi সাত সমুদ্র তেরো নদী
 Akashbasi আকাশবাসী
 Tumi তুমি
 Asanglagna অসংলগ্ন
 Simarekha সীমারেখা
 Tribarna ত্রিবর্ণ
 Alankarpuri অলংকারপুরী
 Jangam জঙ্গম
 Agni অগ্নি
 Dwairath দ্বৈরথ
 Mrigoya মৃগয়া
 Nirmok নির্মোক
 Mandanda মানদন্ড
 Nabadiganta নবদিগন্ত
 Koshtipathar কষ্টিপাথর
 Sthabar স্থাবর
 Bhimpalashri ভীমপলশ্রী
 Pancha Parba পঞ্চপর্ব
 Lakshmir Agaman লক্ষ্মীর আগমণ
 Dana ডানা

Short stories
 Pratibaad
 swadhinata
 "Bonofuler Golpo"
 "Bonofuler Aro Golpo"
 "Bahullo"
 "Bindu Bishorgo"
 "Adrisholok"
 "Anugamini"
 "Tonni"
 "Nobomonjori"
 "Urmimala"
 "Soptomi"
 "Durbin"
 "Bonofuler Sreshto Golpo"
 "Bonofuler Golpo Songroho-1"
 "Bonofuler Golpo Songroho-2"
 "Banaphooler Chhoto Galpa Samagra—1 & 2"
 "Fuldanir Ekti Ful"

Film adaptation of his literature
 Agnishwar
 Bhuvan Shome
 Ekti Raat
 Alor Pipasa (1965)
 Hatey Bazarey
 Arjun Pandit (He received the Filmfare Award for Best Story for this film)
 Tilottama
 Paka Dekha

Postage stamp
On the 100th anniversary of his birth, the Government of India issued a postage stamp featuring his image.

See also
Bengali literature

Further reading

 বনফুলের ছোট গল্প সমগ্র (Complete Short Stories of Banaphul), published by Banishilpa, Kolkata in January 2003
 উপন্যাস সমগ্র (Complete Novels), published by New Bengal Press (Private) Limited, Kolkata in July 1999
 পশ্চাৎপট (Background), the autobiography of Banaphul, published by Banishilpa, Kolkata in 1999

References

 Writers from Kolkata

External links

Balai Chand Mukhopadhyay at the West Bengal Public Library Network
Parabaas Profile

1899 births
1979 deaths
20th-century Bengali poets
Bengali writers
Poets from West Bengal
Recipients of the Rabindra Puraskar
University of Calcutta alumni
20th-century Indian poets
Recipients of the Padma Bhushan in literature & education
Bengali male poets
Indian male poets
20th-century Indian male writers
Best Story National Film Award winners
20th-century pseudonymous writers
Writers from West Bengal